Jeffrey Roger Goodwin (born January 28, 1958) is a professor of sociology at New York University. He holds a BA, MA (Sociology) and PhD (Sociology) from Harvard University.

His research interests include social movements, revolutions, political violence, and terrorism. He is a past chair of the Comparative and Historical Sociology Section, and the Collective Behavior and Social Movements Section of the American Sociological Association (ASA).

The underlying argument of his best known book, No Other Way Out: States and Revolutionary Movements, 1945-1991, is that revolutionary movements are not only a response to economic inequality or exploitation, but are also a response to political repression and violence.

Goodwin has written and edited a number of works with his friend and former NYU colleague James M. Jasper. They wrote a famous critique of the political-opportunity theory developed by Charles Tilly and Doug McAdam, republished in Rethinking Social Movements, which Goodwin and Jasper edited. They also edited The Contexts Reader (New York: W. W. Norton), Social Movements (Routledge), The Social Movements Reader (Wiley-Blackwell), and (with Francesca Polletta) Passionate Politics (University of Chicago Press), a leading work in the sociology of emotions.

In October 2011, Goodwin was one of 132 New York University (NYU) faculty and staff members who signed a statement calling for disinvestment in several American companies that do business in Israel. In response to sharp criticism from Congressman Gary Ackerman, Goodwin accused Ackerman of moral blindness and stated that "Ackerman's apparent denial that Israel is occupying Palestinian territories and systematically violating basic Palestinian rights is simply shocking."

Select publications

Books
No Other Way Out: States and Revolutionary Movements, 1945-1991. Cambridge: Cambridge University Press, 2001 
Passionate Politics: Emotions and Social Movements. Co-edited with James M. Jasper and Francesca Polletta. Chicago: University of Chicago Press, 2001 
Rethinking Social Movements: Structure, Culture, and Emotion. Co-edited with James M. Jasper. Lanham, MD: Rowman & Littlefield, 2004. 
The Social Movements Reader: Cases and Concepts. Co-edited with James M. Jasper. New York: Blackwell, 2003.

Articles
"'The Struggle Made Me a Non-Racialist': Why There Was So Little Terrorism in the Antiapartheid Struggle," Jeff Goodwin (2007), Mobilization, Vol. 12, No. 2, pp. 193–203.
"How Not to Explain Terrorism," Jeff Goodwin (2006), (a review essay on Louise Richardson, What Terrorists Want [2006]), European Journal of Sociology, Vol. 47, No. 3, pp. 477–82.
"A Theory of Categorical Terrorism," Jeff Goodwin (2006), Social Forces, Vol. 84, No. 4, pp. 2027–46.
"What Do We Really Know About (Suicide) Terrorism?," Jeff Goodwin (2006), Sociological Forum, Vol. 21, No. 2, pp. 315–30.
"What Must We Explain to Explain Terrorism," Jeff Goodwin (2004), (a review essay on Jessica Stern, Terror in the Name of God: Why Religious Militants Kill [2004], Social Movement Studies, Vol. 3, No. 2, pp. 259–65.
"Black Reconstruction as Class War," Jeff Goodwin (2022), Catalyst, Vol. 6, No.1, Accessed at: https://catalyst-journal.com/2022/06/black-reconstruction-as-class-war

References

External links
Personal homepage
Homepage at NYU

American sociologists
Revolution theorists
Harvard College alumni
New York University faculty
Living people
1958 births
Contexts editors
Harvard Graduate School of Arts and Sciences alumni